Pseudophilautus karunarathnai (Karunarathna's shrub frog) is a species of frogs in the family Rhacophoridae, endemic to Sri Lanka.

Its natural habitats are wet lowland forests of Sri Lanka. It is threatened by habitat loss. It is one of the 8 species of rhacophorids that was discovered from Adam's Peak recently.

Etymology
The frog was named after Mr. Y. G. P. Karunarathna, a wildlife conservationist of Sri Lanka.

Description
Frog is easily recognizable with orange colored circle around iris. Usually dorsal surface is creamy colored.

References

karunarathnai
Endemic fauna of Sri Lanka
Frogs of Sri Lanka
Amphibians described in 2013